The Reading by-election was a Parliamentary by-election held on 6 August 1904. The constituency returned one Member of Parliament (MP) to the House of Commons of the United Kingdom, elected by the first past the post voting system.

Vacancy 
George Palmer had been Liberal MP for the seat of Reading since the 1898 Reading by-election. He resigned from Parliament in 1904, due to advancing deafness.

Electoral history 
Since the Reading constituency was created in 1885 it had been closely contested between Liberal and Conservative; The Conservatives winning in 1885, 1886 and 1895 and the Liberals in 1892, 1898 and 1900. The Liberal victor on each occasion was Palmer, who was a very well known biscuit manufacturer in the town. At the last election he had won narrowly;

Candidates 

The local Liberal Association selected 44 year-old Rufus Isaacs as their candidate to hold the seat. Isaacs was a London barrister who had been made a QC in 1898. He was standing as a candidate for the first time. In such a marginal seat, the Liberals were taking a risk by choosing an outsider to replace a well-known local man.

The local Conservative Association selected 57 year-old stockbroker Charles Keyser as their candidate. He was contesting Reading for the third time, having lost to Palmer in 1898 and 1900.
There was some expectation of a socialist candidate making it a three-way contest, as had been the case in the 1898 by-election.

Campaign 
Polling day was fixed for the 6 August 1904.

Result 
The Liberals held the seat with an almost identical result to the previous election;

Aftermath 
Keyser did not stand for parliament again. At the following General Election, Isaacs was re-elected;

References 

Reading By-election
Reading By-election
Reading By-election, 1904
20th century in Berkshire